Duddo Tower is a Scheduled Ancient Monument and a Grade II listed building comprising the ruinous remains of an ancient pele tower and 16th century tower house, situated on a prominence on the south side of the village of Duddo, Northumberland, England.

The pele tower was destroyed by the Scots in 1496. The estate was later acquired by the Clavering family who rebuilt a tower house on the site in the late 16th century. The house was usually occupied by a junior branch of the family until it was abandoned as a home in the 17th century.

The estate was sold in 1788 by John Clavering of Callaly Castle to Sir Francis Blake and sold on by the Blakes (for £45000) in 1823 to Thomas Fryer.

References
 History and Antiquities of North Durham (1852) Rev James Raine MA, pages 316-317.
   Keys to the Past
 

Houses completed in the 16th century
Towers completed in the 16th century
Grade II listed buildings in Northumberland
Peel towers in Northumberland
History of Northumberland
Scheduled monuments in Northumberland
Ruins in Northumberland